Clausirion bicolor is a species of longhorn beetle in the family Cerambycidae. It was described by Galileo and Martins in 2000. It is endemic to Bélizon, French Guiana where it flies from August to September.

References

Elaphidiini
Beetles described in 2000
Endemic fauna of French Guiana